The 1933 Limerick Senior Hurling Championship was the 39th staging of the Limerick Senior Hurling Championship since its establishment by the Limerick County Board.

Young Irelands were the defending champions.

On 26 November 1933, Ahane won the championship after a 1-07 to 1-01 defeat of Croom in the final. It was their second championship title overall and their first title in two championship seasons.

Results

Final

References

Limerick Senior Hurling Championship
Limerick Senior Hurling Championship